James Calloway "Cal" Bowdler II (born March 31, 1977) is a retired Irish American professional basketball player. A , 245 lb power forward from Old Dominion University, Bowdler was selected by the Atlanta Hawks in the 1st round (17th overall) of the 1999 NBA Draft and played for the Hawks for three seasons from 1999 to 2002. He has last played professionally in Italy for Kinder Bologna (2002), Montepaschi Siena (2002–2003), Lottomatica Roma (2003–2004) and Casti Group Varese (2004–05).

Bowdler attended Rappahannock High School in Warsaw, Virginia.

Bowdler is the only player in the modern era of basketball to commit seven personal fouls during an NBA game. This happened because the scorekeeper didn't realize seven fouls had been committed until after the game was over.

Currently Cal works for Comcast Cable Communications in Atlanta GA.

Career statistics

NBA

|-
| align="left" | 1999–00
| align="left" | Atlanta
| 46 || 0 || 9.2 || .426 || .000 || .632 || 1.8 || 0.3 || 0.3 || 0.2 || 2.7
|-
| align="left" | 2000–01
| align="left" | Atlanta
| 44 || 0 || 8.5 || .465 || .200 || .825 || 1.8 || 0.1 || 0.2 || 0.5 || 3.2
|-
| align="left" | 2001-02
| align="left" | Atlanta
| 52 || 0 || 11.3 || .351 || .200 || .830 || 2.1 || 0.2 || 0.3 || 0.3 || 3.1
|- class="sortbottom"
| style="text-align:center;" colspan="2"| Career
| 142 || 0 || 9.7 || .404 || .182 || .768 || 1.9 || 0.2 || 0.3 || 0.3 || 3.0
|}

College

|-
| align="left" | 1995–96
| align="left" | Old Dominion
| 23 || - || 8.9 || .340 || .308 || .692 || 1.7 || 0.6 || 0.1 || 0.5 || 2.1
|-
| align="left" | 1996–97
| align="left" | Old Dominion
| 33 || 11 || 19.0 || .433 || .318 || .488 || 4.9 || 0.3 || 0.3 || 1.3 || 5.5
|-
| align="left" | 1997–98
| align="left" | Old Dominion
| 28 || - || 29.6 || .421 || .179 || .556 || 8.8 || 0.5 || 0.5 || 2.4 || 10.2
|-
| align="left" | 1998–99
| align="left" | Old Dominion
| 34 || 34 || 30.0 || .492 || .257 || .731 || 10.0 || 1.3 || 0.5 || 2.9 || 14.7
|- class="sortbottom"
| style="text-align:center;" colspan="2"| Career
| 118 || 45 || 22.7 || .451 || .264 || .625 || 6.6 || 0.7 || 0.4 || 1.9 || 8.6
|}

References

External links
NBA player profile @ NBA.com

1977 births
Living people
American expatriate basketball people in Italy
Atlanta Hawks draft picks
Atlanta Hawks players
Basketball players from Virginia
Irish men's basketball players
Mens Sana Basket players
Old Dominion Monarchs men's basketball players
Pallacanestro Varese players
Pallacanestro Virtus Roma players
People from Richmond County, Virginia
Power forwards (basketball)
Virtus Bologna players
American men's basketball players